3200 Phaethon  (previously sometimes spelled Phaeton), provisional designation , is an active Apollo asteroid with an orbit that brings it closer to the Sun than any other named asteroid (though there are numerous unnamed asteroids with smaller perihelia, such as ). For this reason, it was named after the Greek myth of Phaëthon, son of the sun god Helios. With an observation arc of 35+ years, it has a very well determined orbit. The 2017 Earth approach distance of about 10 million km was known with an accuracy of ±700 m.

Discovery 
Phaethon was the first asteroid to be discovered using images from a spacecraft. Simon F. Green and John K. Davies discovered it in images from October 11, 1983, while searching Infrared Astronomical Satellite (IRAS) data for moving objects. It was formally announced on October 14 in IAUC 3878 along with optical confirmation by Charles T. Kowal, who reported it to be asteroidal in appearance.

Orbital characteristics 

It is also suspected to be a member of the Pallas family of asteroids.

Its most remarkable distinction is that it approaches the Sun closer than any other named asteroid: its perihelion is only  — less than half of Mercury's perihelial distance. It is a Mercury-, Venus-, Earth-, and Mars-crosser as a result of its high orbital eccentricity.

Phaethon is a possible candidate for detecting general relativistic and/or solar oblateness effects in its orbital motion due to the frequent close approaches to the Sun. The Apollo asteroids (155140) 2005 UD and (225416) 1999 YC share similar orbits with Phaethon, suggesting a possible common breakup origin.

Potentially hazardous asteroid 
Phaethon is categorized as a potentially hazardous asteroid (PHA), but that does not mean there is a near-term threat of an impact. It is a potentially hazardous asteroid merely as a result of its size (absolute magnitude ) and Earth minimum orbit intersection distance ). With a 30+ year observation arc, the orbit of Phaethon is very well understood with very small uncertainties. Close approaches of Phaethon are well constrained for the next 400 years.

Physical characteristics 

Phaethon is an asteroid with fairly unusual characteristics in that its orbit more closely resembles that of a comet than an asteroid; it has been referred to as a "rock comet". In studies performed by NASA's STEREO spacecraft in 2009 and 2012, rapid brightening and dust tail have been observed.
It is possible that the Sun's heat is causing fractures similar to mudcracks in a dry lake bed. This occurs because Phaethon's orbit takes it closer to the Sun than any other named asteroid (0.14 AU at perihelion) causing extreme heating and enough solar radiation pressure to push any separated pieces off the asteroid's surface. Since its discovery, several other objects were found exhibiting mixed cometary and asteroidal features, such as 133P/Elst–Pizarro, leading to a new class of objects dubbed "active asteroids".

In 2018, observations revealed that Phaethon was blue in color.  This is extremely rare, as most asteroids tend to be grey or red.  In 2020, polarimetric study revealed Phaethon has a surface with steep slopes covered by a mix of regolith with larger pebbles.  Phaethon's composition fits the notion of its cometary origin; it is classified as a F-type asteroid because it is composed of dark material or a B-type asteroid because of its blue color.  In 2022 it was shown  how Phaethon's blue color and its rock-comet-like emission activity can be explained by the effects of the intense solar heating at perihelion causing sublimation of any darkish-red refractory organic, nano-phase iron (nFe0), and pyroxene materials on its surface.

Meteor shower 
Shortly after its discovery, Fred Whipple observed that the "orbital elements of 1983 TB shown on IAUC 3879 are virtually coincident with the mean orbital elements of 19 Geminid meteors photographed with the super-Schmidt meteor cameras". In other words, Phaethon is the long-sought parent body of the Geminids meteor shower of mid-December.

Planned flyby 
DESTINY+ (Demonstration and Experiment of Space Technology for INterplanetary voYage Phaethon fLyby dUSt science) is a planned mission to fly by 3200 Phaethon, as well as various minor bodies originating from it. The spacecraft is being developed by the Japanese space agency JAXA, and will demonstrate advanced technologies for future deep space exploration. DESTINY+ is planned to be launched no earlier than 2024.

Close approaches 
When Phaethon came to perihelion in July 2009, it was found to be brighter than expected. During its approach, the STEREO-A spacecraft detected an unexpected brightening, roughly by a factor of two.

2010 approach

2017 approach 
On December 16, 2017, at 23:00 UT, Phaethon passed  from Earth (27 lunar distances). The Earth approach distance was known with a 3-sigma precision of ±700 m.

The asteroid was bright enough to see in small telescopes, peaking at magnitude 10.8 between December 13–15 while dimming slightly to magnitude 11 on December 16 at closest approach. Arecibo made observations of Phaethon from December 15–19. It will not make an Earth approach closer than the 2017 passage until December 14, 2093, when it will pass  from Earth.

Notes

References

External links 

 (3200) Phaethon by the Associazione Friulana di Astronomia e Meteorologia
 "The 2004 Geminid Meteor Shower" by Science@NASA
 "ScienceCasts: Rock Comet Meteor Shower" by Science@NASA on YouTube.com
 Phaethon orbit and observations at IAU Minor Planet Center
 
 
 

003200
003200
003200
Named minor planets
003200
003200
003200
Mercury-crossing asteroids
Venus-crossing asteroids
Earth-crossing asteroids
003200
003200
003200
003200
003200
003200
19831011